Parry Jones may refer to:
Caryl Parry Jones (born 1958), Welsh female singer
David Parry-Jones (1933–2017), Welsh sports commentator
Gwynn Parry Jones (1891–1963), Welsh tenor
Rhys Parry Jones (active from 1993), Welsh TV actor
Richard Parry-Jones (1951–2021), British automobile designer
Tom Parry Jones (1935–2013), Welsh scientist and inventor

See also
Love Parry Jones-Parry (1781–1853), British army officer and High Sheriff of Anglesey
Jones Parry